Marvin Gaye was an American music artist and singer-songwriter who won acclaim for a series of recordings with Motown Records. Gaye's personal life, mainly documented in the biography, Divided Soul: The Life of Marvin Gaye, included religious faith, child abuse by his father, personal relationships with his two wives, friends and girlfriends, and bouts with depression and drug abuse.

Childhood religion and abuse
Marvin Gaye and his five siblings were brought up in a strict religious Pentecostal sect known as the House of God by their minister father Marvin Gay Sr. Marvin began singing church solos at the age of four. The House of God took its teachings from Hebrew Pentecostalism, advocated strict conduct, and adhered to both the Old and New Testaments. Gaye remembered the family having to observe an extended Sabbath starting from "Friday night at sundown" into Saturday. He later explained, "We kept the Sabbath in the purest sense. Father anointed converts with olive oil and baptized them in the river. The Sabbath was his day, it was God's day, and it was also a day for singing. Every member was blessed with a good voice. The joy of music was the joy of God." At times, Gaye's father would force his children to answer Biblical questions, disciplining them if they answered wrong.

Gaye's relationship with his father was troubled from childhood. According to his sister, Jeanne, Gaye suffered at the hands of his father, who would strike him for any shortcoming, including putting his hairbrush in the wrong place or coming home from school a minute late. Gaye's sister recalled that Marvin would "constantly provoke Father. He disappeared on Saturday mornings when it was time to go to church." Jeanne Gaye explained that between the ages of 7 well into his teenage years, young Marvin's home life "consisted of a series of brutal whippings." Gaye explained his father's abuse to author David Ritz years later, stating "It wasn't simply that my father beat me, though that was bad enough. By the time I was twelve, there wasn't an inch on my body that hadn't been bruised and beaten by him." He stated what made the beatings worse was his father prolonging the time before punishing Marvin, making him remove his clothes, and having him hear his father's belt buckle loud enough before he received the punishment. Gaye felt a part of his father was "enjoying the whole thing". Marvin and his siblings were also bed wetters, which was the result of more whippings. The beatings deeply affected Marvin to the point that whenever he needed to express his need for attention, he would do it through antagonism and projections of violence.

While Gaye would later describe living with his father was "like living with a king, a very peculiar, changeable, cruel and all-powerful king", he embraced the love of his mother, explaining, "if it wasn't for Mother, who was always there to console me and praise me for my singing, I think I would have been one of those child suicide cases you read about in the papers".

Air Force tenure
In 1956, a 17-year-old Marvin ran away from home to enlist in the United States Air Force. Sent to bases in states such as Kansas, Texas and Wyoming, Marvin quickly grew tired of having to do menial tasks and began rebelling against the sergeant's strict orders. Eventually, Gaye told officers he had a mental illness and was honorably discharged shortly afterwards in early 1957. Before leaving the Air Force, Gaye lost his virginity to a prostitute. Gaye explained the experience as "freaky" and started an obsession with what he liked to call, "love for sale". Gaye noted he saw "a world of pure sex where people turned off their minds and fed their lusts, no questions asked. The concept sickened me, but I also found it exciting." Upon his exit from the Air Force, his sergeant stated that Marvin refused to follow orders.

Marriages

Anna Gordy Gaye
Marvin first met Anna Ruby Gordy (January 28, 1922 – January 31, 2014), 17 years his senior, while Marvin was a staff drummer for the label, Anna Records, around 1960. It started with Marvin flirting with her to get her attention. After a two-year courtship, the couple married on June 8, 1963, in Chicago.

During Gaye's early years in Motown, he was inspired by his relationship with his wife, often writing songs dedicated to her, including his 1963 top ten hit, "Pride and Joy". Of that song, Gaye later told David Ritz, "When I composed 'Pride and Joy', I was head over heels in love with Anna. I just wrote what I felt about her, and what she did for me. She was my pride and joy." The marriage was reportedly volatile and according to Gaye's biographer David Ritz, Anna was physically and verbally abusive to her younger husband. By the turn of the 1970s, however, Marvin had begun to counter his wife's attacks. Rumors of infidelity also deeply soured the marriage and later influenced Gaye's later recordings, including his 1968 number one hit, "I Heard It Through the Grapevine".

Though admittedly not much of a songwriter or composer, unlike her younger sister Gwen Gordy, she did provide ideas to some of her husband's compositions, most notably the songs later made successful by The Originals, including the hits "Baby I'm for Real" and "The Bells". Anna also was partially credited for the song "God is Love" from Marvin's What's Going On album. An earlier song, "Just to Keep You Satisfied", was also credited to her as well as Marvin and their friend, Kenneth Stover, who was also credited for "God is Love". By 1973, following Gaye's legal separation from Anna, Marvin rewrote the lyrics to the song changing it from a romantic ode to an emotional ballad documenting the end of their marriage. The couple relocated to Los Angeles in late 1972 and Marvin filed for legal separation in the winter of 1973, shortly before Marvin met Janis Hunter. In November 1975, Anna filed for divorce. A contentious divorce case followed for a year and a half before it was finalized on May 4, 1977.

In the divorce decree, Gaye agreed to remit a portion of his royalties to go to Anna for his next album. That album, Here, My Dear, was released to dismal sales in December 1978. Despite being so hurt by the album that she considered filing a privacy lawsuit in 1979, Anna eventually forgave Marvin and the former couple would maintain a close friendship until Marvin's untimely death.

Birth and adoption of Marvin Gaye III
On November 17, 1965, a baby boy was born to Denise Gordy, six days after her sixteenth birthday. The boy was subsequently adopted by Marvin and Anna. The boy was christened at Detroit's Bethel AME Church and was named after his adoptive father. Prior to Marvin III's birth, 43-year-old Anna had faked a pregnancy in public. It was later reported that Gordy was told that she could not naturally conceive a child. Despite his acrimonious relationship with his father, he named him Marvin III "to keep up with tradition". Although it's not been confirmed whether or not Gaye was the biological father, Denise Gordy admitted in 1998 that she was the mother of Marvin III. Due to Marvin not filing a will before his death, Marvin III became a co-executor of his father's estate at just 18. In 1995, Gaye III welcomed his first son, Marvin IV, on the 56th anniversary of his father's birth. Five years later, a second boy Dylan, was born.

Janis Gaye
Gaye met 17-year-old Janis Hunter (January 5, 1956 - December 3, 2022) in March 1973 while working on his Let's Get It On album with producer Ed Townsend. Hunter was the child of jazz musician Slim Gaillard. Townsend's former girlfriend Barbara Hunter arrived in the studio with Janis that month. Janis's presence served as inspiration for Gaye during the making of the album. After their first date, Gaye was inspired to record the composition, "If I Should Die Tonight". The couple later moved in together, first to Gaye's one-room apartment outside Hollywood and then at Topanga Canyon. During Gaye's 1974 concert tour, he performed the ballad, "Jan", to his new love. Janis first received public notice when she was featured with Marvin on a November 1974 issue of Ebony.

On September 4, 1974, the couple welcomed their first-born, daughter Nona, in Los Angeles. Son Frankie Christian followed a year later on November 16, 1975, a day before Marvin III's and his namesake uncle's birthday. After Gaye's divorce to Gordy was finalized, Gaye married Janis in October 1977 in New Orleans. It was alleged Gaye married her due to concurrent tax issues, but Janis would contend they married after surviving a car accident. Janis later stated Gaye sometimes coerced her into having relationships with other men. The contents of Gaye's 1976 album, I Want You, was heavily inspired by Gaye and Hunter's torrid affair. Author Michael Eric Dyson stated that their relationship in inspiration to the creation of I Want You was "nearly palpable in the sensual textures that are the album's aural and lyrical signature".

Their "open" marriage, domestic abuse and the couple's drug dependence became too disastrous and Janis filed for legal separation in 1979. Janis later admitted she went "back and forth across the ocean, around and around, just chasing this relationship that never worked, but I wasn't willing to give up and neither was he." Despite divorcing in February 1981, the former couple kept in touch and tried to renew a relationship during Gaye's final tour only to separate after another argument, having their final conversations by phone prior to Gaye's death. In 1997, Nona Gaye had a son, Nolan Pentz.  Jan Gaye died on December 3, 2022, at her home in Rhode Island, at the age of 66.

Other relationships
During the 1960s, it was often debated that Gaye dated his female singing companions such as Mary Wells and Kim Weston; Wells denied any romantic ties to Gaye and Weston later stated their relationship was strictly platonic. The same was said of Gaye's relationship with his most successful duet partner Tammi Terrell. Gaye was deeply devastated following Terrell's collapse at a concert in Virginia where they were performing in 1967. Terrell's later diagnosis and death from a brain tumor would help to send Gaye to a depression. Gaye often blamed himself for Terrell's illness and death despite the fact that Terrell may have developed her tumor since her early childhood.  Gaye's devastation over Terrell's death fueled his cocaine addiction.

Following Gaye's separation from Janis, Gaye began dating Dutch-based model Eugenie Vis for two years. Gaye was also involved with British socialite Lady Edith Foxwell (1918-1996) during the early 1980s. At one point, according to author Bernard J. Taylor, Foxwell explained that her and Gaye's relationship became serious enough to consider marriage by 1982. Gaye's final girlfriend was an Englishwoman named Deborah Decker. In 1984 Decker later told Parade magazine that she carried Gaye's unborn child during Gaye's final year alive. When family tension became too much, Gaye moved her to an apartment in West Hollywood. Decker later miscarried Gaye's child.

Drug use
Marvin was a heavy marijuana user, during the beginning of his tenure as a member of Harvey and the Moonglows, and he would remain a heavy user throughout his life. Marvin was first introduced to cocaine in the early 1960s. At first, Marvin had issues snorting, so he would use it by either rubbing it on his gums or eating it, but by the late 1970s, he had developed a serious dependence and addiction to the drug and would later begin freebasing while in London.  The singer was also a user of PCP. Gaye was briefly sober after having moved to Belgium under the watchful eye of Freddy Cousaert, only to relapse when he returned to the United States from Belgium in October 1982. His addiction led to increasing paranoia and depression. During the promotion of his Sexual Healing Tour, he wore a bullet-proof vest and brought along bodyguards with loaded pistols because he feared for his life as he was convinced that someone was plotting to kill him. When an autopsy was produced on Marvin, they found minor traces of cocaine in his system. Judge Ronald George believed that PCP (or angel dust) was present in Marvin's system, but this was due to a misreading of the coroner's report.

Suicide attempts
Gaye attempted suicide at least three times. The first occurred in 1969 when he was holed up at a Detroit apartment. Gaye, despondent from his failing marriage at the time, sought to shoot himself with a handgun. Berry Gordy's father, "Pops", eventually stopped this attempt. In 1979, while in Maui, Gaye ingested a full ounce of cocaine in a second suicide attempt. Gaye explained later, "I'd given up. The problems were too big for me. I just wanted to be left alone and blow my brains on high-octane toot. It would be a slow but relatively pleasant death, certainly less messy than a gun." Four days before his death, according to his sister Jeanne, Marvin again attempted suicide by jumping out of a speeding sports car only to suffer minor bruises. According to Frankie Gaye, after he found him dying from his gunshot wounds, Gaye explained that he had his father shoot him because he "couldn't do it himself". In an interview a year before his death in 1984, he explained his bouts with depression, stating that during his exile, he was "a manic-depressive. I was at my lowest ebb. I really didn't feel like I was loved. Because I didn't feel love, I felt useless."

References

Sources

 
 
 
 
 
 
 
 
 
 

Gaye, Marvin
Marvin Gaye